Asta Gröting (born in Herford, Germany 1961) is a contemporary artist. She works in a variety of media like sculpture, performance, and video. In her work, Gröting “is conceptually and emotionally asking questions of the social body by taking something away from it and allowing this absence to do the talking.”

Biography
Asta Gröting studied sculpture at the Düsseldorf Academy of Arts, graduating in 1986. Her work has been shown in solo exhibitions at KINDL - Centre for Contemporary Art Berlin, the Kunstraum Dornbirn, the Neuer Berliner Kunstverein, the LENTOS Art Museum in Linz, and the Henry Moore Sculpture Institute, among others. She has also participated in international group exhibitions at venues including the Maas Museum in Sydney, the German Hygiene Museum in Dresden, the Hartware Medienkunstverein Dortmund, and the 22nd Bienal de São Paulo. She is currently a professor at the Braunschweig University of Art.

Gröting's earlier work focused on sculpture, before she also turned to video and performance, starting 1993. Gröting's works often present ordinary, familiar elements, where the viewer's attention is drawn towards their material transformation, caused by the exaggeration of the familiar. In Gröting's work there is a focus on what is not visible, like the inner voice, the space between lovers having sex, the digestive system, or the inside of holes made by bullets, and the ways in which the invisible can be brought to the surface. As such, she allows absence to do the talking. In these explorations a sense of realism is at work that pays attention to what is not considered to be beautiful, or to what is seen as damaged or even damaging. It develops works that convert psychological and emotional perspectives to the complex relationships of people into clear forms. Often they are presented in work groups or series.

Series (selection)

Berlin Fassaden (2016–2018) consists of a series of negative imprints made out of silicone that are monumental in size. They track the traces of the bullet holes made during war in facades that have not yet been renovated. For Gröting the casts function as photographic long exposures that depict the story from the moment of the bullets’ impact to the present time, taking along dust, dirt, and even graffiti. “I want to look from inside these destroyed walls and facades into the world,” Gröting says, “as if I could see my own face staring back at me.”

Touch is an ongoing series, which the artist started in 2015. Gröting invited a number of friends to sit for a portrait. The portrait consists of the artist tracing the contours of their face with her hands. It recalls the gestures of sculpting, reading the face's expression. Although it's a touching of a surface, it's at the same time also a most intimate conversation.

In The Traveling Carriage of Goethe the Mercedes of Adenauer and My Smart (2011) Gröting made full-scale casts of the undersides of three vehicles from three different centuries. The rubber molds visualize a sculptural history of movement. Motion is also the topic of Gröting's video Parken, in which from a bird's eye view we see several cars competing for a parking space.

Space Between Lovers (2008–) is the materialization of a physical intimate moment. Two actors were covered in silicone while they were having sex. In this way, the in-between, the inner space was visualized sculpturally. Both intimacy and distance define also Space Between a Family (2010–2015), which consists of life-size casts of members of Gröting's family made over the course of several years. “It is not hard to imagine that these introspective figures possess internal organs,” the British author Deborah Levy writes, “but they are uncanny too, mournful grey ghosts of substance who seem to be emerging from both a war and a womb.”

From the early nineties onwards, Gröting took beside sculpture an interest in immaterial media like performance and video. For The Inner Voice (1993–2004) Gröting explored ventriloquism as a performative instrument to research the soul and its inner workings. A series of videos came about depicting conversations between a dummy created by the artist and ventriloquists from all over the world. In their own native language they performed dialogues written by Gröting, Deborah Levy, and Tim Etchells. On several occasions Gröting worked together with the Native American ventriloquist Buddy Big Mountain.

Solo exhibitions (selection)

 2017: Berlin Fassaden, Teil I, KINDL – Zentrum für Zeitgenössische Kunst, Berlin, Germany
 2017: (Im)mutable, Asta Gröting – Sean Snyder, HBK Galerie, Braunschweig, Germany
 2017: Die Geschichte der Werkzeuge ist das aufgeschlagene Buch der menschlichen Psychologie, Kunstraum Dornbirn, Austria
 2016: Touch, Galerie Carlier | Gebauer, Berlin, Germany
 2015: Asta Gröting, Galerie Carlier | Gebauer, Berlin, Germany
 2014: Asta Gröting, Arbeiten aus der Sammlung der Landesbank Baden-Württemberg und der Sammlung Grässlin, ZKM | Zentrum für Kunst und Medientechnologie Karlsruhe, Germany
 2010: Parallel Performances, Asta Gröting, Maria Eichhorn, Arter, Istanbul, Turkey
 2010: Asta Gröting, Neuer Berliner Kunstverein, Berlin, Germany
 2010: Asta Gröting, Lentos, Linz, Austria
 2009: Asta Gröting Sculpture: 1987–2008 Henry Moore Sculpture Institute, Leeds, UK
 2006: The Inner Voice, MARTa, Herford, UK

Group exhibitions (selection)

 2017: This is a Voice, Maas Museum, Sydney, Australia
 2017: Das Gesicht. Eine Spurensuche, Deutsches Hygiene Museum Dresden, Germany
 2017: Das Auto in der Kunst seit 100 Jahren, Kunsthalle Emden, Germany
 2016: Touring Exhibition: The Withdrawal of the Red Army, Northern Norway Art Museum, Tromsø, Norway 07.11.2015 – 24.01.2016
 2016: This is a voice, Wellcome Collection, London, UK 14.04.–31.07.2016
 2015: Blicke ! Körper ! Sensationen ! Das Dresdner Wachskabinett und die Kunst, Deutsches Hygiene Museum, Dresden, Germany
 2015: All the World's a Stage, Works from the Goetz Collection, Fundación Banco Santander, Madrid, Spain
 2015: Terrapolis, Whitechapel Gallery & NEON Foundation, École Français, Athens, Greece, curated by Iwona Blazwick
 2015: His Master's Voice: Von Stimme und Sprache, La Panacée, Centre de Culture Contemporaine, Montpellier, France
 2014: Reines Wasser, Lentos, Linz, Austria
 2014: International Biennial of Contemporary Art of Cartagena de Indias, Colombia
 2014: Liebe, Wilhelm-Hack-Museum, Ludwigshafen, Germany
 2013: Iskele 2. The Unanswered Question, Tanas, Berlin, Germany
 2013: Bad Girls, FRAC Lorraine, Metz, France
 2013: His Master's Voice, Hartware MedienKunstVerein – HMKV, Dortmund, Germany
 2012: Atelier + Küche, Marta Herford, Germany
 2011: Maria Eichhorn & Asta Gröting, Kunsthal 44 Møen, Askeby, Denmark
 2011: The Inner Voice/ I AM BIG, Nomadic Nights, Fondation Cartier pour l’art contemporain, Paris, France
 2010: Starter, Arter, Vehbi Koç Foundation contemporary art collection, Istanbul, Turkey

Awards
 1996: Preis der Bayrischen Landesbank International S.A.
 1994: Otto-Dix-Preis, Gera
 1991: Förderpreis für Bildende Kunst des Landes Nordrhein-Westfalen
 1990: A.&W. Grohmann Fellowship, Baden-Baden
 1989: Schmidt-Rotluff-Fellowship
 1988: Stiftung Kunstfonds

Public collections (selection)

Verein der Freunde der Nationalgalerie for the Collection Nationalgalerie Berlin, Berlin / Arnold Forde, Los Angeles, USACarol Schwartz, Denver, USA / Collection Helga de Alvear, Madrid, Spain / evn sammlung, Maria Enzersdorf, Austria / Fonds Régional d'Art Contemporain (FRAC), Limoges, France / Fundació la Caixa, Barcelona, Spain / Hypo - Bank, Munich / Institut für Auslandsbeziehungen (ifa), Stuttgart / Jerome Stern, New York, USA / Koç Foundation, Istanbul, Turkey / Landesbank Baden- Württemberg, Stuttgart / MARTa Herford, Herford / Museum Ludwig, Cologne / Saint Louis Art Museum, Saint Louis, USA  / Sammlung Block, Berlin / Sammlung Deutsche Bank, Frankfurt a.M. / Sammlung Goetz, Munich / Sammlung Grässlin, St. Georgen / Sammlung Schwenk, Haigerloch / Staatsgalerie Stuttgart / Stedelijk Museum voor Actuele Kunst (SMAK), Gent, Belgium  / Valdemar Gerdin, Stockholm, Sweden/ Von der Heydt-Museum, Wuppertal

Bibliography

 Asta Gröting, Berlin Fassaden, ed. Andreas Fiedler, exhibition catalogue KINDL - Centre for Contemporary Art, Berlin, September 10 - December 3, 2017  
 Asta Gröting, Die Geschichte der Werkzeuge ist das aufgeschlagene Buch der menschlichen Psychologie, exhibition catalogue Kunstraum Dornbirn, Austria, March 17 - May 14, 2017  
 Asta Gröting, exhibition catalogue, eds. Marius Babias and Stella Rollig, Neuer Berliner Kunstverein - n.b.k. Berlin and Lentos Kunstmuseum Linz, Köln 2010 
 Asta Gröting. Sculpture: 1987–2008, exhibition catalogue Henry Moore Sculpture Institute, 8 February - 26 April 2009, Leeds 2009
 Asta Gröting. The Inner Voice, eds. Jan Hoet and Christoph Keller, Revolver, Archiv für Aktuelle Kunst, Frankfurt am Main 2004 (English and German)

External links
 Website of the artist 
 Asta Gröting's profile at carlier | gebauer gallery
 "Abwesenheitsnotiz: Asta Gröting. Von Kołobrzeg nach Gdańsk", in Monopol, July 17, 2017
 Interview with Asta Gröting about her show at n.b.k. (Neuer Beriner Kunstverein) by art-in-tv, 2010
 ZKM Karslruhe about Asta Gröting

References

German contemporary artists
Living people
1961 births
Academic staff of the Braunschweig University of Art
People from Herford
Artists from North Rhine-Westphalia